Bathycongrus unimaculatus is an eel in the family Congridae (conger/garden eels). It was described by Emma Stanislavovna Karmovskaya in 2009. It is a tropical, marine eel which is known from the southern Loyalty Basin in New Caledonia. It usually dwells at a depth range of 430–450 metres. Males can reach a maximum total length of 28.3 centimetres.

The species epithet "unimaculatus" means "one spot" in Latin, and refers to a large dark spot on the anal fin of the eel.

References

unimaculatus
Fish described in 2009